The Nuclear Suppliers Group (NSG) is a multilateral export control regime and a group of nuclear supplier countries that seek to prevent nuclear proliferation by controlling the export of materials, equipment and technology that can be used to manufacture nuclear weapons.

History 

The NSG was founded in response to the Indian nuclear test in May 1974 and first met in November 1975. The test demonstrated that certain non-weapons specific nuclear technology could be readily turned to weapons development. Nations already signatories of the Nuclear Non-Proliferation Treaty (NPT) saw the need to further limit the export of nuclear equipment, materials or technology. Another benefit was that non-NPT and non-Zangger Committee nations, then specifically France, could be brought in.

A series of meetings in London from 1975 to 1978 resulted in agreements on the guidelines for export; these were published as INFCIRC/254 (essentially the Zangger "Trigger List") by the International Atomic Energy Agency. Listed items could only be exported to non-nuclear states if certain International Atomic Energy Agency safeguards were agreed to or if exceptional circumstances relating to safety existed.

The name of the "London Club" was due to the series of meetings in London. It has also been referred to as the London Group, or the London Suppliers Group.

The NSG did not meet again until 1991. The "Trigger List" remained unchanged until 1991, although the Zangger list was regularly updated. The revelations about the Iraqi weapons program following the first Gulf War led to a tightening of the export of so-called dual-use equipment. At the first meeting since 1978, held at the Hague in March 1991, the twenty-six participating governments agreed to the changes, which were published as the "Dual-use List" in 1992, and also to the extension of the original list to more closely match the up-to-date Zangger list.

Participating governments 
Initially the NSG had seven participating governments: Canada, West Germany, France, Japan, the Soviet Union, the United Kingdom, and the United States. In 1976-77, participation was expanded to fifteen with the admittance of Belgium, Czechoslovakia, East Germany, Italy, the Netherlands, Poland, Sweden, and Switzerland. Germany was reunited in 1990 while Czechoslovakia broke up into the Czech Republic and Slovakia in 1993. Twelve more nations joined up to 1990. Following the collapse of the Soviet Union a number of former republics were given observer status as a stage towards future membership. China became a participating government in 2004. The European Commission and the Zangger Committee Chair participate as observers. The NSG Chair for 2022-2023 is Argentina.

, the NSG has 48 participating governments:

Candidate Participants

India

During a state visit to India in November 2010, U.S. President Barack Obama announced U.S. support for India's participation in the Nuclear Suppliers Group, the Wassenaar Arrangement, the Australia Group and the Missile Technology Control Regime, "in a phased manner," and to encourage the evolution of regime participation criteria to that end, "consistent with maintaining the core principles of these regimes."

During a visit to India in December 2010, French President Sarkozy also expressed his country's backing for India's inclusion in Nuclear Suppliers Group. The United Kingdom has for a long time been a supporter of India's inclusion in the Nuclear Suppliers Group. During Republic Day visit of India in January 2015, Obama said that India was ready for NSG membership. Russian president Vladimir Putin has also offered unconditional support to India's entry into NSG.

Switzerland also announced its backing on India's participation in 48 member group on 6 June 2016 during PM Modi's visit to Geneva, President Obama reiterated U.S. support for India's NSG membership on 8 June 2016 during PM Modi's visit to Washington DC.  Japan has expressed support for India's bid for accession to the NSG.

However, China is opposing India's accession citing Pakistan's non-admission in the exclusive group. Other countries opposing Indian membership of the Nuclear Suppliers Group (NSG) on the basis of NPT non-signatory status of India included New Zealand, Ireland and Austria.

In June 2016, India got crucial support from Mexico in its bid to become a participant of the NSG ahead of a plenary meeting of the 48-nation bloc whose members are allowed to trade in and export nuclear technology. On 17 June, British Prime Minister David Cameron had assured Prime Minister Narendra Modi of the UK's "firm support" for India's NSG membership bid. In an interview on 18 June, Russian President Vladimir Putin said that he was 'positive' about India's entry into NSG. On 20 June, Canada stated that NSG will be strengthened with India's presence. On 22 June France reiterated its support to India, and urged all the other 48 members of the NSG to allow entry for India into the atomic control body.  China remains opposed to Indian membership.

In July 2016, South Africa agreed to back India's entry into the NSG. In August 2016, Turkey confirmed support for India's NSG membership bid. On 4 September 2016, Australia reiterated its commitment to India's bid for membership of the Nuclear Suppliers Group just ahead of the G20 summit in Hangzhou, China. On 5 September 2016, Prime Minister Narendra Modi thanked Argentina for backing India's bid.

On 17 October 2016, following the BRICS summit in Benaulim, Goa, Brazil officially backed India's bid for NSG membership. On 26 October 2016, Prime Minister Key of New Zealand stated that "New Zealand would continue to contribute constructively to the process currently underway in the NSG to consider India’s membership." Poland and Cyprus backed India's NSG bid in April 2017.  Germany reaffirmed India's NSG membership bid in May 2017. Switzerland also showed support for India's NSG bid. The Swiss Foreign Ministry spokesperson Pierre-Alain Eltschinger said that “We support India’s application for participation in the NSG and acknowledge India’s support to global non-proliferation efforts.” During the 15th RIC (Russia, India, China) foreign ministerial meeting Russia has said it continues to support India’s entry into the exclusive Nuclear Suppliers’ Group. Describing India as a leading power in the Indo-Pacific region, Washington's envoy to New Delhi, Kenneth Juster reaffirmed support for India’s NSG bid in January 2018. In the joint press statement of India-Nordic countries summit, The Nordic countries welcomed India’s application for membership of the Nuclear Suppliers’ Group and reaffirmed their commitment to work constructively within the Group with the aim of reaching a positive outcome at the earliest opportunity in April 2018. On 16 April 2018 Germany supported India's bid for NSG membership saying that India's inclusion into the NSG will boost the global export control system. Reaffirming their commitment to global non-proliferation efforts, PM Conte reiterated Italy's support to India's intensified engagement for admission into the Nuclear Suppliers' Group (NSG) in Oct 2018 during the 24th edition of the India-Italy Technology Summit.

As of 2019, China has thwarted every attempt of India's inclusion into NSG and has made it clear that status quo will remain citing "lack of consensus" among NSG members.

Pakistan

Pakistan applied for participation on 19 May 2016. Pakistan has stressed the need for NSG to adopt a non-discriminatory criteria-based approach for NSG membership of the countries, which have never been party to the nuclear Non-Proliferation Treaty (NPT).

Pakistan is supported by Turkey and China. Pakistan has launched a major lobbying campaign to get additional support on its NSG membership.  The US has not publicly opposed Pakistan, the US State Department's Spokesperson Mark Toner commented in May 2016: “They have made public their interest, and certainly any country can submit its application for membership. And we’ll consider [it] based on a consensus decision.” Subsequently, NSG initiated discussions on the ‘Technical, Legal, and Political aspects of participation of non-NPT states in the NSG’ in the Seoul Plenary in June 2017. China has also tied Indian bid to Pakistani bid, blocking the former's entry repeatedly based on the argument that If India can be let in without signing NPT, then Pakistan should be granted membership as well.

In 2004, the illicit procurement network run by Pakistani scientist AQ Khan, who led Pakistan's uranium enrichment program, was exposed.  This network trafficked in nuclear and dual-use goods and supported nuclear weapons programs in Iran, Libya and North Korea as well as Pakistan itself, and included individuals and entities from over 30 countries. In 2004, Pakistan also promulgated an Export Control Act on Goods, Technologies, Materials and Equipment related to Nuclear and Biological Weapons and their Delivery Systems and published Export Control Lists in 2005, which have been frequently updated. The United States on 26 March 2018 sanctioned seven Pakistani firms for nuclear proliferation, potentially hurting its ambitions of NSG membership.

Namibia

Namibia applied for NSG membership in 2016.

Role in India-US nuclear agreement 

In July 2006, the United States Congress amended U.S. law to accommodate civilian nuclear trade with India. A meeting of NSG participating governments on 21–22 August 2008 on an India-specific exemption to the Guidelines was inconclusive. Several participating governments, including Austria, Switzerland, Norway, Ireland, and New Zealand, expressed reservations about the lack of conditions in the proposed exemption. In another meeting on 6 September 2008, the NSG participating governments agreed to grant India a "clean waiver" from its existing rules, which forbid nuclear trade with a country which has not signed the Nuclear Non-Proliferation Treaty (NPT).  The NSG's decision came after three days of intense U.S. diplomacy. The approval was based on a formal pledge by India stating that it would not share sensitive nuclear technology or material with others and would uphold its voluntary moratorium on testing nuclear weapons. The pledge was contained in a crucial statement issued during the NSG meeting by India outlining the country's disarmament and nonproliferation policies.

References

External links
 NSG - Official Website
 - What is the NSG?  The NSG explained in 5 minutes
 The Nuclear Suppliers Group: Its Guidelines, Origins, Structure, and Role
 Nuclear Suppliers Guidelines Part 1 - Trigger List
 Nuclear Suppliers Guidelines Part 2 - Dual Use

Nuclear weapons
Intergovernmental organizations
Nuclear proliferation
Organizations established in 1974